Wanda Włodarczyk (15 July 1925 – 21 December 2003) was a Polish fencer. She competed in the women's individual foil event at the 1952 Summer Olympics.

References

Sources
B. Tuszyński, H. Kurzyński, Od Chamonix i Paryża do Vancouver. Leksykon olimpijczyków polskich 1924-2010 wyd. Fundacja Dobrej Książki, b.d i m. w., str. 915, 

1925 births
2003 deaths
Polish female fencers
Polish foil fencers
Olympic fencers of Poland
Fencers at the 1952 Summer Olympics
People from Cieszyn Silesia
People from Bielsko County
Sportspeople from Silesian Voivodeship
20th-century Polish women
21st-century Polish women